Bruno Hollnagel (born 13 January 1948) is a German politician (till 2021 Alternative for Germany (AfD)) and since 2017 member of the Bundestag.

Life and politics

Hollnagel was born 1948 in the West German city of Hamburg and studied engineering management at the University of Lübeck.

Hollnagel entered the newly founded AfD in 2013. According to Der Spiegel, Hollnagel was one of the party members who joined AfD because of critics of the federal government's euro rescue policy. He became a member of the Bundestag in 2017. End of June 2021 he resigned from the AfD but remained a member of the Bundestag.

References

1948 births
Living people
Members of the Bundestag 2017–2021
Members of the Bundestag for the Alternative for Germany
Members of the Bundestag for Schleswig-Holstein
Politicians from Hamburg